Barking Lizards Technologies was an American video game developer that develops for mobile phones, PlayStation 2, Game Boy Advance, Nintendo DS, PlayStation Portable, Wii and personal computer. Founded in 2001, Barking Lizards Technologies is based in Richardson, Texas. Their titles were published through several major video game publishers, namely THQ, and Activision, and have recently published a title of their own, Osiris Legends for iOS.

Prior to their expansion into games development in 2006, they specialized in providing support and project outsourcing services to existing games companies.

In 2006, Barking Lizards created the subsidiary Wild Hare Entertainment to publish games from external sources.  The company focused entirely on PC titles for a short time before shutting down.

Whiptail
Barking Lizards Technologies developed Whiptail, a multiplatform game engine, which they used to develop their video game titles. They developed 3 versions of Whiptail, which are used to handle different platforms, Whiptail 3D, Whiptail Handheld, and Whiptail Mobile.

Games developed
Nintendo DS
 Bratz: Forever Diamondz (2006 — for THQ)
 El Tigre: The Adventures of Manny Rivera (2007 — for THQ)
 Zoey 101: Field Trip Fiasco (2007 — for THQ)
 Bratz 4 Real (2007 — for THQ)
 Super Collapse 3 (2007 - for MumboJumbo)
 Bratz Girlz Really Rock (2008 - for THQ)

Game Boy Advance
 Bratz: Forever Diamondz (2006 — for THQ)
 Marvel: Ultimate Alliance (2006 — for Activision)
 Bratz Babyz (2006 — for THQ)
 Bratz: The Movie (2007 — for THQ)
 Zoey 101 (2007 — for THQ)

Wii
 The Naked Brothers Band (2008 - for THQ)

PlayStation 2
 Activision Anthology (2002 — with Contraband Entertainment — for Activision)
 The Naked Brothers Band (2008 - for THQ)

PC
 Command & Conquer: The First Decade (2006 — for Electronic Arts)
 The Naked Brothers Band (2008 - for THQ)

N-Gage
 X-Men Legends (2005 — for Activision)
 X-Men Legends II: Rise of Apocalypse (2005 — for Activision)

N-Gage 2.0
 Snakes Subsonic (2008 — for Nokia Publishing)

Mobile phones
 The Elder Scrolls IV: Oblivion (2005)
 Cthulhu World Combat (2013) (Cancelled) 

PlayStation Portable
 SpongeBob's Truth or Square (2009)

References

External links
 Company Website

2001 establishments in Texas
Video game development companies
American companies established in 2001
Video game companies established in 2001
Defunct video game companies of the United States
Companies based in Richardson, Texas
Defunct companies based in Texas